The Journal of Higher Criticism is an academic journal covering issues "dealing with historical, literary, and history-of-religion issues from the perspective of higher criticism", published by the Institute for Higher Critical Studies. The editor-in-chief is Robert M. Price. The periodical is held in the Library of Congress and other research libraries.

In the introductory article, the editor criticized modern biblical scholarship as "a toothless tiger or worse yet, covert apologetics wearing the Esau-mask of criticism" and advocated a return to the "golden era of bold hypotheses and daring reconstructions associated with the great names of Baur and Tübingen".

The final issue before Doughty's retirement (volume 10, no. 2) appeared in Fall, 2003. It continued for two more issues independently of an institution with volumes 11 and 12, each with two issues before ending.

The journal was revived in March 2018. Vol. 13, no. 1, was published to Robert M. Price's website. Volume 13, nos. 1-4; volume 14, nos. 1, supplement, and 4; volume 15, nos. 1-3; and volume 16, nos. 1-2, were subsequently published and are available for sale at a major online book retailer, as of January 2022.

References

External links
 

Religious studies journals
Publications established in 1994
Biblical criticism
Publications disestablished in 2003
English-language journals
Biannual journals